Nambeesan (also written as Nambisan, Nambissan, Nambiyassan or Nampeesan) is a Pushpaka Brahmin caste of Kerala, India.

Brahmanippattu
The women of the Nambeesan caste, known as Brahmani Ammas, are entitled to perform Brahmanippattu, a type of domestic devotional offering performed usually in connection with marriages.

See also
 Pushpaka Unni

References

Malayali Brahmins
Indian surnames